Antonio Durán (19 August 1924 – 11 January 2009) was a Spanish footballer and manager. He is most notable for managing Malmö FF, being the club's most successful manager in terms of championships.

Honours

Player

Atlético Madrid
La Liga (2): 1949–50, 1950–51

Manager

Malmö FF
Allsvenskan (4): 1965, 1967, 1970, 1971
Svenska Cupen (1): 1967

References

External links
 

1924 births
2009 deaths
People from Selva
Sportspeople from the Province of Girona
Spanish footballers
Footballers from Catalonia
Córdoba CF players
Atlético Madrid footballers
Real Oviedo players
Spanish football managers
Sandvikens IF managers
Åtvidabergs FF managers
Malmö FF managers
Djurgårdens IF Fotboll managers
Expatriate football managers in Sweden
Spanish emigrants to Sweden
Association football midfielders